Domenico Antonio Vaccaro (June 3, 1678 – June 13, 1745) was an Italian painter, sculptor and architect. He created many important sculptural and architectural projects in Naples.  His later works are executed in an individualistic Rococo style.

Life
Domenico Antonio Vaccaro was born in Naples as the son of Lorenzo Vaccaro. His father Lorenzo was a pupil of Cosimo Fanzago.  Domenico Antonio Vaccaro first studied under his father.  He subsequently trained in the workshop of Francesco Solimena.

He initially dedicated himself to painting but from around 1707 he appears to have practised almost exclusively as a sculptor and architect. In the 1730s he resumed painting.

Works of interest include a statue of Moses in the church of San Ferdinando, interior work at the Chiesa di Santa Maria in Portico, and the statues of Penitence and Solitude on the premises of the monastery (now museum) of San Martino.

He also designed the Palazzo Tarsia and Palazzo Caravita at Portici, the church of San Giovanni at Capua, and he reconstructed the Cathedral of Bari. He helped reconstruct the church of Santa Maria della Pace, damaged after an earthquake. He designed the Palace of the Immacolatella at the water's edge in central Naples. He designed the small church of Santa Maria della Concezione a Montecalvario, Naples.

Selected works

Architecture
Church San Michele Arcangelo, Naples
Church Santa Maria della Concezione a Montecalvario, Naples
Palace of the Immacolatella, Naples
Church Santa Maria della Stella, Naples (completion)

Sculptures
San Gennaro, Naples Cathedral
Guardian angel, in San Paolo Maggiore church, Naples

References

Sources
Francesco Milizia, The lives of celebrated architects, ancient and modern. Volume I, (1826) Translated by Mrs. Edward Cresy, J. Taylor Architectural Library, High Holborn, London, Page 321.
Benedetto Gravagnuolo e Fiammetta Adriani, Domenico Antonio Vaccaro. Sintesi delle Arti, Naples, Guida, 2005.
Vincenzo Rizzo, Lorenzo e Domenico Antonio Vaccaro. Apoteosi di un binomio, Naples, Altrastampa, 2001.

External links

17th-century Neapolitan people
1678 births
1745 deaths
17th-century Italian painters
Italian male painters
18th-century Italian painters
17th-century Italian sculptors
Italian male sculptors
18th-century Italian sculptors
Painters from Naples
Italian Baroque painters
18th-century Neapolitan people
18th-century Italian male artists